Claudia Aravena Abughosh (born 21 October 1968) is a Chilean visual artist, curator, short filmmaker, and professor who has worked mainly in the field of contemporary art.

Life and work
Claudia Aravena studied graphic design at University ARCIS, which she later complemented with a degree in audiovisual communication and a master's in cultural studies. Some of her works are framed within urban art and media art through installations, photography, and audiovisual presentations, where the city takes a fundamental role as a central thematic axis, in addition to autobiographical and cultural identity fusion.

Exhibitions and distinctions

In addition, she has participated in several international film festivals, including the International Documentary Film Fest in Paris, the Palermo International Video Art Festival in Italy, the International Documentary Film Festival of Leipzig in Germany, and the 9th International Documentary Film Festival in Lisbon.

In 2002 she received a nomination for the Altazor Award for National Arts in the Installation and Video Art category for Lugar común, in co-authorship with Guillermo Cifuentes.

References

External links
 
 

1968 births
Living people
20th-century Chilean educators
20th-century Chilean women artists
21st-century Chilean educators
21st-century Chilean women artists
Artists from Santiago
Chilean art curators
Chilean documentary filmmakers
Chilean people of Arab descent
Chilean women curators
Women documentary filmmakers